Vtoraya Pyatiletka is a village in Almaty Region of south-eastern Kazakhstan.

References

Populated places in Almaty Region